= The Latent Image =

- Directed by: Alexander McGregor Birrell
- Written by: Alexander McGregor Birrell; Joshua Tonks
- Produced by: Cedric Andries
- Starring: Joshua Tonks; Jay Clift; William Tippery
- Cinematography: Michael Elias Thomas
- Edited by: Lisa Rustage
- Music by: Alex Gregson; Jack Hughes
- Production companies: Latent Image; June Gloom Productions
- Distributed by: Cinephobia Releasing
- Release dates: 11 November 2022 (SoHo Horror Film Festival); 7 September 2023 (Los Angeles); 9 October 2023 (UK)
- Running time: 83 minutes
- Country: United Kingdom
- Language: English

The Latent Image is a 2022 British psychological thriller film directed by Alexander McGregor Birrell, starring Joshua Tonks, Jay Clift and William Tippery.

== Cast ==
- Joshua Tonks as Ben
- Jay Clift as The Man
- William Tippery as Jamie

== Reception ==
Pat King of Dread Central rated the film 4.5 stars out of 5 and called it a "must-see psychological thriller about those things we keep in the closet."

Bobby LePire of Film Threat praised the "decent" characterisations", the "strong" cast, the music and the cinematography, but wrote that it "relies too heavily on the "it’s all a dream" to the point of the plot being a bit messy".

Phuong Le of The Guardian rated the film 3 stars out of 5 and wrote that the "sizzling chemistry between Tonks and Clift manages to bring a heat to The Latent Image where the plot and photography may have fallen short."
